
Gmina Ryczywół is a rural gmina (administrative district) in Oborniki County, Greater Poland Voivodeship, in west-central Poland.

Massacre during Second World War
During the German Invasion of Poland in 1939, German minority members from Selbstschutz units mass murdered 21 Poles between 13 and 24 September. In most of the cases the victims had their skulls crashed by hand tools. Among Germans responsible following names have been identified:Erwin Bruno, Alexander Muller, Leonard Fietz, Kurt Munak, Georg Wendlandt, Heinz Noak, Willi Hubner.

Villages
Gmina Ryczywół contains the villages and settlements of Boruchowo, Chlebowo, Chmielewo, Dąbrówka Ludomska, Drzonek, Gorzewko, Gorzewo, Gościejewko, Gościejewo Leśne, Igrzyna, Krężoły, Łaszczewiec, Lipa, Lipa Nowa, Lipa-Bagna, Lipa-Wojciechowo, Łopiszewo, Ludomicko, Ludomki, Ludomy, Ninino, Orłowo, Piłka-Młyn, Piotrowo, Połajewice, Radom, Ryczywół, Skrzetusz, Tłukawy, Trzy Góry, Wiardunki and Zawady.

Neighbouring gminas
Gmina Ryczywół is bordered by the gminas of Budzyń, Czarnków, Oborniki, Połajewo and Rogoźno.

References
Polish official population figures 2006

Ryczywol
Oborniki County
Massacres in Poland
Germany–Poland relations
World War II crimes in Poland